Neal Bates (born 19 March 1965) is an Australian rally and racing car driver. Throughout his career Bates has been associated with Toyota in the Australian Rally Championship and for 19 years his Neal Bates Motorsport outfit ran Toyota's official rally program in Australia. Bates claimed four drivers' titles in this time and helped Toyota win four manufacturers' crowns.

Bates' navigator/co-driver since 1993 has been Coral Taylor.

Bates long-time partnership with Toyota also brought the first of many circuit racing opportunities, a drive in a star search program in Toyota's Australian Touring Car Championship team. This led to a number of touring car racing opportunities with the factory Toyota Corolla teams as well as V8 Supercar teams including Paul Weel Racing, Glenn Seton Racing and Gibson Motor Sport.

Career results

WRC results

Complete Bathurst 1000 results

* Super Touring race

Complete Sandown endurance results

References

External links
 Neal Bates website
 WRC Results (eWRC)
 Profile on Driver Database

1965 births
Australian rally drivers
Australian Touring Car Championship drivers
Living people
Sportspeople from Canberra
Racing drivers from the Australian Capital Territory
Supercars Championship drivers
World Rally Championship drivers
Australian Endurance Championship drivers
Toyota Gazoo Racing drivers
Twin sportspeople